Raymond Bernard Milton (August 27, 1912 Port Arthur, Ontario – September 17, 2003) was a Canadian ice hockey player who competed in the 1936 Winter Olympics.

Milton was a member of the 1936 Port Arthur Bearcats, which won the silver medal for Canada in ice hockey at the 1936 Winter Olympics. In 1987 he was inducted into the Northwestern Ontario Sports Hall of Fame as a member of that Olympic team.

References

External links
profile

1912 births
2003 deaths
Ice hockey players at the 1936 Winter Olympics
Olympic ice hockey players of Canada
Olympic silver medalists for Canada
Olympic medalists in ice hockey
Medalists at the 1936 Winter Olympics